Gottlieb Ziegler (9 August 1828 – 22 June 1898) was a Swiss politician and President of the Swiss National Council (1873/1874).

External links 
 
 

Members of the National Council (Switzerland)
Presidents of the National Council (Switzerland)
1828 births
1898 deaths